Michelle Elizabeth Collins (born Michelle Elizabeth Cikk; July 9, 1981) is an American comedian and talk show host. Collins came into the entertainment industry as the managing editor of VH1's bestweekever.tv, a pop culture website that tied into the series of the same name. The site earned her two Webby Awards for Best Celebrity Fan Blog. In 2010, Collins joined as a co-host on the new LOGO/VH1 show The Gossip Queens, which was also in limited syndication. She joined The View on July 13, 2015, for the 19th season as a co-host. She was let go on June 3, 2016. She hosted her own Sirius XM talk show, The Michelle Collins Show, from 2018 until 2022.

Early life
Collins was born on July 9, 1981, in Miami Beach, Florida  as Michelle Cikk, to Judy and Mel Collins, who changed their names when she was a young girl. She has an older brother. Her parents are of Eastern European Jewish descent. She graduated from Barnard College in New York with a B.A. in Art History. Collins worked as a legal assistant prior to becoming a comedian.

Career

Career beginnings
Collins started as managing editor for VH1's Best Week Ever website for six years. According to Collins, she broke the story of Jared Fogle's early pornography business during her time writing for the website. She also covered major events such as the Wimbledon Championships, the Oscars and the Olympics Vanity Fair.  She also contributed to Elle.  Before joining The View, Collins made regular appearances as a panelist on Chelsea Lately, The Joy Behar Show, The Tyra Banks Show, Red Eye w/ Greg Gutfeld, The Wendy Williams Show, and various VH1 productions. She also had her own web talk show, Martini Minute, on which she has interviewed celebrities such as Adam Lambert, New Kids on the Block, Travie McCoy, and Jessica Simpson. Collins also appeared on and wrote for Kathy Griffin's talk show. In 2009, she won the ECNY Award for Best Female Standup Comedian in New York, and in the same year she was featured as a "Comedian to Watch" in the magazine YRB. In 2010, she won LOGO's NewNowNext Award for "Breakout Comic".

The View
On July 13, 2015, after making several appearances from February of that year, Collins was announced to have signed on as a co-host on The View for the nineteenth season. At the time, Collins stated that she had wanted to be on the show since she was four years old. During Collins' tenure on The View, the show was experiencing low ratings and staff turmoil. The show brought in new management and introduced new segment formats, as well as an emphasis on politics due to the 2016 election. According to Variety, the new managers did not like Collins' hosting style, which included personal anecdotes, and Collins' subject expertise did not fit with the new political bent of the show. In 2004, Collins co-founded voter mobilization group, Votergasm.org. Collins also received negative audience feedback for two on-air incidents, where she criticized nurses in October 2016, and joked on a segment that presidential candidate Carly Fiorina's face looked "demented" when smiling during a Republican presidential primary debate. By January, Collins' appearances on the show were reduced to one or two segments a week.  

On June 3, 2016, it was announced that Collins was fired from The View, effective immediately. Collins made a statement confirming her departure from the show on June 17, 2016, via Instagram.

After The View, Radio shows

On July 13, 2016, a new show hosted by Collins was released on ABC Digital titled All My Gay Friends Are Getting Married. Collins was also announced as the host of After Paradise, the live after-show of Bachelor in Paradise. Additionally, she hosted two shows on  Lifetime TV: Little Talk Live and Date Night Live. On July 8, 2018, Collins became the host of the new TLC Channel show "90 Day Live".  "90 Day Live" is a recep/review show that takes place directly after the weekly show "90 Day Fiancée: Happily Ever After?" on TLC.  The show features Michelle giving a recap of that week's show events along with special guests.  Collins also appears regularly as a guest host on the Today Show.

In March 2018, she began her daily Sirius XM morning show The Michelle Collins Show on the Sirius XM Stars channel. The radio show covers pop culture and entertainment, and included  interviews with celebrity guests, newsmakers, experts, and reality TV stars. In August 2021, she started broadcasting on the Radio Andy channel on Sirius XM. Additionally, Collins hosts a podcast, Midnight Snack with Michelle Collins, which succeeded her previous podcasts Fresh Batch and Edit That Out. On October 21, 2022 the final episode of her SiriusXM show aired.   Soon after she relaunched The Michelle Collins Show radio show on paid-subscription service Patreon.

Awards and nominations

References

External links
 
 
 
 

1981 births
Living people
American women comedians
American people of Eastern European descent
Barnard College alumni
Jewish American female comedians
American television talk show hosts
People from Miami Beach, Florida
21st-century American comedians
21st-century American women
21st-century American Jews